Animal Notes is the second album by American rock band Crack the Sky, released in 1976 (see 1976 in music).

Track listing

Personnel

The band
John Palumbo —  Lead vocals, keyboards, acoustic guitar, harmonies
Rick Witkowski – Electric guitar, harmonies
Joe Macre – Bass guitar, harmonies
Jim Griffiths – Electric guitar, harmonies
Joey D'Amico – Drums, harmonies

Additional musicians
David Sackson — Concert master
"Singin' Mounties" — Vocals ("Rangers at Midnight")
George Marge — Horns ("We Want Mine")
Robert "Chic" DiCiccio – Horns ("We Want Mine")
Gotham City Swing Band – Horns ("We Want Mine")

Production
Terence P. Minogue – Producer
Marty Nelson – Producer
William Kirkland – Producer
Shelly Yakus – Engineer
Andy Abrams – Engineer
Don Puluse – Recorded orchestra

Additional credits
Terence P. Minogue – Horn and string arrangements
Recorded at the Record Plant, New York City
Orchestra recorded at CBS Studios, New York City
Danny Palumbo – Live sound engineer
Darrell Grysko – Lighting design
Hauser and D'Orio – Back cover photography
Guy Billout – Illustration
Lopaka – Art direction and design
"This record is given to Derek with our respect"

Alternate version
In 1989, Lifesong released a CD pairing Animal Notes with Safety in Numbers on a single disc (LSCD-8803). To fit both albums on one CD, the track "Prelude to Safety in Numbers" was omitted from the latter album.

References

1976 albums
Crack the Sky albums